Charles Muguta Kajege (born June 3, 1962) is a Member of Parliament in the National Assembly of Tanzania.

References
 Parliament of Tanzania website

Alumni of University of London Worldwide
1962 births
Living people
Members of the National Assembly (Tanzania)
Place of birth missing (living people)